Litaviccus (ca. 50 BC) was a member of the Gallic tribe of Aedui. He played an important role at the Siege of Gergovia. Though the Aedui at first supported Julius Caesar in his struggle against Vercingetorix, they defected from the Romans and joined Vercingetorix.

According to Caesar in his Commentarii de Bello Gallico, the Aedui had been roused into this betrayal by Convictolitavis, the leader of the Aedui. During the siege of Gergovia, Litaviccus was given command over 10,000 men who were sent to aid Caesar. During the march, however, Litavccus gave a speech to his soldiers where he claimed the Romans had killed the nobles of the Aedui, and that they had the same planned for the rest of the tribe. This convinced the soldiers to desert the Romans and instead join Vercingetorix.

Though the army of Litaviccus was very small compared to the Legions of Caesar, Caesar was nonetheless forced to remove a part of his soldiers at Gergovia to deal with Litaviccus.

Litaviccus' rebellion did not last long; when Caesar presented the (according to Litaviccus) murdered nobles of the Aedui, the soldiers realized they had been lied to and surrendered, after which Litaviccus escaped and fled to Gergovia.

Celts
Gaulish rulers
Barbarian people of the Gallic Wars